Jan-Lennard Struff was the defending champion but lost in the first round to Daniil Medvedev.

Pierre-Hugues Herbert won the title after defeating Norbert Gombos 7–5, 4–6, 6–3 in the final.

Seeds

Draw

Finals

Top half

Bottom half

References
Main Draw
Qualifying Draw

Open d'Orleans - Singles
2016 Open d'Orléans